The Great Northern route (formerly known as Great Northern Electrics) is the name given to suburban rail services run on the southern end of Britain's East Coast Main Line and its associated branches. Services run through parts of Greater London, Hertfordshire, Bedfordshire, Cambridgeshire, and Norfolk.

The route forms a major commuter route into London from Hertfordshire, Cambridgeshire, and eastern Bedfordshire: ridership has grown rapidly over recent years. In 2009, rolling stock was transferred from other lines to allow additional services and longer trains to be run. In early 2018, the line was connected to the Thameslink route via a junction just south of the High Speed 1 bridge, north of King's Cross, allowing through services to the south of London.

Since September 2014, the services have been operated by Govia Thameslink Railway (GTR). The Thameslink and Great Northern service brands were maintained and separated from each other.

Route 
The network consists of all local and semi-fast services on these lines:
 East Coast Main Line south of Peterborough
 Northern City Line
 Hertford Loop Line
 Cambridge Line

Additionally, the main service on the Fen Line is provided as part of the route. All services are provided by EMUs.

At privatisation the services became part of West Anglia Great Northern, becoming their sole route in 2004 when the West Anglia services were transferred to 'one'. In April 2006 the services became the responsibility of First Capital Connect. In September 2014, the Department for Transport transferred the new Thameslink, Southern and Great Northern franchise to Govia Thameslink Railway. In 2018, with the completion of the Thameslink Programme, many services on the route became part of the Thameslink network, running through central London to destinations south of the River Thames.

History 
The term Great Northern is related to the Great Northern Railway, the original builders of the line.

The July 1922 Bradshaw's Railway Guide stated a typical rail service on the Cambridge Line as follows:

  to  - Six stopping and two (three on Saturday) semi-fast services from Monday to Saturday, one northbound and two southbound stopping services on Sunday. The fastest service took about 1 hour 30 minutes.
 London King's Cross to  - Two (three on Wednesday) additional services from Monday to Saturday, one additional service on Sunday.
 London King's Cross to  - Seven additional services from Monday to Saturday.
 London King's Cross to  - Three additional services from Monday to Saturday. The last service on Wednesday ran past midnight into Thursday morning.

In 1978 the electrification was complete to Royston with  EMUs providing the service. The route was then promoted as the Great Northern Electrics. From 1979 until 1987 DMUs provided the service between Hitchin and Huntingdon/Peterborough. DMUs also provided a shuttle service between Royston and Cambridge between 1978 and 1988, connecting with the electric trains and replacing the former through Cambridge buffet expresses between Kings Cross and the university city.

In 1982 Watton-at-Stone station was reopened between Hertford and Stevenage.

This electrification was completed in 1988. Later the track between these points was also upgraded with welded joint track instead of the jointed track that had existed, and the maximum line speed was raised to 90 mph.

Rapid growth on the route, especially on the Cambridge Line resulted in consultation on a new service pattern, which was then implemented at the timetable change in Spring 2009. During the peak hours, the route is now saturated and can support no further service improvements.

Hitchin Flyover 

Proposals as part of the original electrification work envisaged a new underpass here and land was set aside for its construction. However, budgetary constraints forced this part of the programme to be abandoned. The land stood empty for many years, but has since been used to provide new housing.

A new plan and subsequent application for an order to build a flyover was approved, and construction was completed in June 2013. The scheme has created a new single-track line that diverges from the northbound slow line at a new junction just beyond Hitchin station, using a short embankment section of the former Bedford to Hitchin Line, a section of which was cleared of vegetation and made progressively higher, to form a short ramp. The track is carried over the East Coast Main Line on a newly constructed viaduct and onto a new embankment to join the present Cambridge Line at the newly created Hitchin East Junction, closer to Letchworth. Although this takes trains over a longer distance, it removes the need for them to dwell at Hitchin – sometimes for several minutes – awaiting a path across the tracks of the main London-Peterborough route, thus decreasing the overall journey time to Cambridge in many instances. The scheme improves the punctuality and reliability of both the London-Cambridge and London-Peterborough routes, because Peterborough-bound stopping trains are no longer delayed if running closely behind a Cambridge service being held at Hitchin waiting to cross the flat junction.

Thameslink programme

As part of the Thameslink Programme, the Great Northern Route has been connected to the existing Thameslink route via a new junction at Belle Isle (south of the High Speed 1 flyover, just north of London King's Cross). Two single-bore tunnels (known as the Canal Tunnels) were driven from here to the low-level platforms at  during the 'St Pancras Box' phase of the redevelopment works that created St Pancras International station. Trains diverging from the Great Northern Route at Belle Isle will join the 'core' St Pancras -  -  -  section of the existing Thameslink route and then serve stations across Surrey, East Sussex, Kent, and West Sussex.

On 6 November 2017 the first Thameslink Programme units entered service on the Great Northern route. 700128 worked the 0656 Peterborough - London King's Cross and 1812 return, while 700125 worked the 0733 Peterborough - London King's Cross and 1742 return. Eventually 75% of the GN fleet will be Class 700 units.

Services

The Great Northern off-peak service pattern, with frequencies in trains per hour (tph), consists of the following:

Rolling stock

Of these, Class 365s lasted until 15 May 2021, at which point they were replaced by Gatwick Express Class 387/2 units which were being used by Southern while the service was suspended.

Current fleet

Past fleet
Trains formerly used on the Great Northern Route include, but are not limited to, the following:

Future developments

East-West (Varsity) line

It was closed in 1968 but there are now plans to restore this route.

References

Further reading

External links
 

Railway lines in the East of England
Railway lines in London
Transport in Hertfordshire
Transport in Bedfordshire
Transport in Cambridgeshire
Rail transport in Norfolk
Standard gauge railways in England
Great Northern Railway (Great Britain)
Rail transport in Cambridge